Aina Basso  (born 1979) is a Norwegian historian and novelist. She made her literary debut in 2008 with the historical novel Ingen må vite. The novel Fange 59. Taterpige from 2010 is set in Trondheim in the  18th century. Her novel Inn i elden from 2012 treats the witch trials in Finnmark in the 17th century. The novel was well received, and was nominated for the Nordic Council Children and Young People's Literature Prize in 2013.

References

1979 births
Living people
Norwegian women novelists
21st-century Norwegian novelists
Norwegian historical novelists
Norwegian children's writers
Norwegian women children's writers
21st-century Norwegian historians
21st-century Norwegian women writers
Norwegian women historians